Queen Elizabeth College (simply known as QEC) is a state Co-Educational secondary school for Years 9-13 in the city of Palmerston North, New Zealand.

Location
The school is located on Rangitikei Street, Palmerston North.

Facilities
Queen Elizabeth College has many facilities and resources for its students, such as:

 Two gyms
 A music suite
 Te Matui (Kitchens, sleeping and classroom)
 Arts suite

QEC is the home of ACE Night School (Adult Continuing Education)

Colours
The colours of Queen Elizabeth College are black, maroon and gold.

History
Queen Elizabeth College was founded in 1906 as Palmerston North Technical School. However the school was 4 years in the making, from a public meeting held in the city in 1902, gauging public interest in technical classes. The first classes were held at the Palmerston North High School (which was also split into two single gender secondary schools) and also at Campbell Street School.

In 1903, the High School and the Technical School were separated.

In 1908, land was bought at Princess Street, when in 1909 a building was opened to house the school (this is now the main campus of UCOL).

Notable alumni
 Ria Bond, New Zealand First MP 
 Jacqui Dean, former television and radio host. National MP for Otago, Waitaki.
 Nehe Milner-Skudder, rugby union player. All Black, Hurricane and Manawatu Turbo.

Notes

Educational institutions established in 1906
Schools in Palmerston North
Secondary schools in Manawatū-Whanganui
1906 establishments in New Zealand